Hawbush is a council estate in Brierley Hill, West Midlands (formerly Staffordshire), England. It was built in the 1920s and 1930s.

It has been served by a primary school, Hawbush Primary School, since 1930, when 5-7 infant and 7-11 junior schools were opened. The infant school became the first school in September 1972, covering the 5-8 age range, while the junior school became a middle school for pupils aged 8-12. The two schools merged to form a primary school in September 1983. A nursery unit for 3 and 4 year olds was also on the site from at least 1976. The school's age range was altered to 3–11 in September 1990 after the final 12-year-olds left.

Housing estates in England
Areas of Dudley
Brierley Hill